Kevin Strijbos (born 13 August 1985 in Geel) is a Belgian former professional motocross racer. He competed in the Motocross World Championships from 2000 until 2021.

Strijbos was the 1999 85cc motocross world champion and, in 2001 he won the 125cc European motocross championship. In 2006, Strijbos finished second in the world championship behind Stefan Everts. He finished second again in 2007, this time behind Steve Ramon. He was a member of the winning Belgium team at the 2004 Motocross des Nations event that included Ramon and Stefan Everts.

He ended his professional racing career on 10 November 2021 at the GP of Mantua in Italy.

References 

1985 births
Living people
People from Geel
Belgian motocross riders
Sportspeople from Antwerp Province